Bratin Sengupta (13 August 1963 in Calcutta, West Bengal) is an Indian politician and member of the Bharatiya Janata Party. He was a Member of Parliament, representing West Bengal in the Rajya Sabha as a member of the Communist Party of India (Marxist).

References 

Politicians from Kolkata
Communist Party of India (Marxist) politicians from West Bengal
Bharatiya Janata Party politicians from West Bengal
Members of the West Bengal Legislative Assembly
Living people
1963 births
21st-century Indian politicians
20th-century Indian politicians